The Sâne Vive, or Sâne, is a  long river in the Ain and Saône-et-Loire départements, eastern France. Its source is at Lescheroux. It flows generally northwest. It is a left tributary of the Seille into which it flows between La Genête and Brienne.

Its main tributary is the Sâne Morte.

Départements and communes along its course
This list is ordered from source to mouth: 
 Ain: Lescheroux, Saint-Nizier-le-Bouchoux, Courtes, Curciat-Dongalon, 
 Saône-et-Loire: Montpont-en-Bresse, La Chapelle-Thècle, Ménetreuil, Jouvençon, La Genête, Brienne,

References

Rivers of France
Rivers of Ain
Rivers of Saône-et-Loire
Rivers of Bourgogne-Franche-Comté
Rivers of Auvergne-Rhône-Alpes